Volga Group is a privately held investment vehicle that manages assets on behalf of the businessman Gennady Timchenko.

History 

Volga Group was established as Volga Resources in 2007, and renamed as Volga Group in June 2013. The group consolidates Gennady Timchenko's assets and makes investments in financial services; industrials and construction; trading and logistics; consumer goods; and energy. Gennady Timchenko noted that for the next few years, his group will focus on the development of infrastructure projects in Russia.

Major assets 

Among Volga Group's major assets are a 23% stake in Novatek, Russia's second-largest producer of natural gas; 15.3% of petrochemicals company Sibur, 50% of the gas company Petromir, and 60% through the joint venture with Gunvor in the coal company Kolmar.

Other investments include 63% of construction company STG Group, 31.5% of CJSC Stroitransgaz, 60% of the rail company Transoil, 100% of beverage maker Aquanika, 79% of timber company Rörvik Timber, 25% of construction companies ARKS Group and SK MOST Group, 60% of aviation company Avia Group, 49.1% and 12.5% of insurance companies Sovag and Sogaz, and 9% of Rossiya Bank.  It also owns 50% of Hartwall Arena in Helsinki and Helsinki Jokerit hockey team.

Key people 

Gennady Timchenko is the founder and main shareholder of Volga Group.  Chlodwig Reuter is the chairman of the board of Volga Group. and Sven Olsson.

References

External links 
 

Investment companies of Luxembourg
Luxembourgian companies established in 2007
Companies based in Luxembourg City
Financial services companies established in 2007
Russian entities subject to the U.S. Department of the Treasury sanctions